Tabrett Bethell (born 13 May 1981) is an Australian film, television, and stage actress, best known for portraying the character Cara Mason in the television series Legend of the Seeker. Prior to her acting career, she worked as a fashion model from the age of 16, and as a cheerleader for the National Rugby League (NRL) Cronulla-Sutherland Sharks.

Acting career
After Bethell's early years as a model and cheerleader, she decided to actively pursue acting and trained at Screenwise, completing the 12 Month Intensive program in December 2007. During this training she continued to model; most notably a Neill Grigg race day fascinator resembling the Harbour Bridge for a February 2007 cover of The Daily Telegraph. Early acting work included starring as Amy in Campbell Graham's film Anyone You Want, and the role of Chris in Strangers Lovers Killers, released 2010.

From 2009 to 2010, Bethell filmed Legend of the Seeker, a television show based on Terry Goodkind's Sword of Truth series. She portrays a Mord'Sith named Cara Mason who appeared at the end of the first season before becoming a regular in Season 2. Bethell garnered a large fan following because of her portrayal of Cara Mason in Legend of the Seeker.

After Legend of the Seeker, Bethell played Beth in James Rabbitts's Australian thriller The Clinic, which was shot in Deniliquin, NSW, Australia in November 2008. In August 2010 Bethell won Best Actress at the Manhattan Film Festival for her role in Anyone You Want.

In March 2011, Bethell was cast in a Warner Bros TV pilot, "Poe", as the character of Sarah Elmira Royster, Edgar Allan Poe's muse and former lover. In May 2011, it was announced that ABC would not pick up the series.

Tabrett Bethell made her Bollywood debut with the Hindi action thriller film Dhoom 3: Back in Action, which was released 20 December 2013. She joined Aamir Khan and Katrina Kaif in the third installment of the popular Dhoom series. The film became the highest-grossing Bollywood film of all time in international markets.
She guest starred in Mistresses Season 2, Episode 6 ("What Do You Really Want"), as Kate. The episode aired 7 July 2014. In March 2014 she was cast in the independent short film Oren as lead. The film won two prizes at the 2015 Hollywood Reel Independent Festival Best Actress Tabrett Bethell and Best International Short Film. She was cast in 2015 as regular in Mistresses season 4 filmed in 2016.

Personal information
Bethell is named after a street in Sydney, Tabrett Street, something that resulted when her parents disagreed on what to name her while still at the hospital (her mother wanted "Siobhan", and her father wanted "Murray"). Her father went for a drive, saw the name of the street, and returned to the hospital to suggest it to her mother, who said, "Yes, that's it!".

Filmography

Theatre

References

External links
 
 
 
 

Australian female models
21st-century Australian actresses
Models from Sydney
Australian television actresses
Australian film actresses
Australian cheerleaders
Actresses from Sydney
1981 births
Living people
Australian stage actresses